The AAAI Squirrel AI Award for Artificial Intelligence for the Benefit of Humanity is an annual prize of US $1 million given by the Association for the Advancement of Artificial Intelligence to recognize the positive impacts of AI to meaningfully improve, protect, and enhance human life. The award is presented annually at the AAAI conference in February.

The first recipient, in 2021, was Regina Barzilay of MIT for her work developing machine learning models to address drug synthesis and early-stage breast cancer diagnosis.

Recipients

See also 
  AAAI Awards
 List of computer science awards
 Association for the Advancement of Artificial Intelligence
 Squirrel AI
 Turing Award
 Nobel Prize

References

External links 
 Squirrel AI Award

Association for the Advancement of Artificial Intelligence
Awards established in 2021
Computer science awards
International awards